Carroll High School is located in Ozark, Alabama, United States.

Ozark Schools is also one of three municipal school systems that take on-post Fort Rucker families at the secondary level.

Notable alumni
 Bobby Bright, United States Congressman from Alabama
 Larry Donnell, tight end for the New York Giants
 Wilbur Jackson, running back with the San Francisco 49ers and Washington Redskins 
 Meg McGuffin, Miss Alabama 2015
 Steve McLendon, nose tackle for the New York Jets
 Byron Mitchell, 2x WBA Super middle weight champion

References

External links 
Carroll High School
Great Schools, Inc: Carroll High School

Public high schools in Alabama
Schools in Dale County, Alabama